Boiling Point is an unincorporated community located in the Antelope Valley of the Mojave Desert, in northern Los Angeles County, California.

The settlement is located along the Sierra Highway, west of Palmdale.

Ritter Ranch Park, a multi-purpose recreational area, is located north of the settlement along Boiling Point Road.

References

 	

Unincorporated communities in Los Angeles County, California
Antelope Valley
Populated places in the Mojave Desert
Unincorporated communities in California